The Heraion at Foce del Sele (English "Heraion at the mouth of the River Sele") is an archaeological site consisting of an Ancient Greek sanctuary complex dedicated to the goddess Hera in Magna Grecia (southern Italy).

The complex was constructed from the 6th to at least the 3rd centuries BC, and included a Greek temple and other buildings.  It was in the countryside, and may have included buildings to accommodate pilgrims. In the Middle Ages most of the stones were removed for use as building materials or other purposes. After the best surviving pieces, including around 70 6th-century metope reliefs, were excavated and moved to the museum at Paestum, there is very little to see at the site itself other than the lowest courses of the buildings. A modern "museo narrante" has been built there with video displays to explain and reconstruct the site.

Historical sources
The existence of the sanctuary is reported by historic sources, but for a long time was not corroborated by other evidence. Strabo located the sanctuary of Argive Hera at the northern border of Lucania, on the left bank of the river Sele, about fifty stades from the city of Paestum and attributed its foundation to Jason during the expedition of the Argonauts. The same sanctuary is located on the other bank of the river by Pliny the Elder. These differing accounts made the rediscovery of the remains difficult.

History

The sanctuary was founded at the beginning of the sixth century BC by the Greek colony at Paestum, originally from further south at Sybaris, and dedicated to Argive Hera, the Greek goddess of women and marriage, as well as navigation.  The Sele then represented a boundary between Greek and Etruscan areas of influence.

Initially cult activities must have been performed in the open, in a sacred area equipped with an altar and bounded by porticos for hosting pilgrims. At the end of the sixth century, a grand temple was built, which was probably octastyle (with a facade of eight columns) and peripteral. Two other buildings were built some distance in front of it at the same time.

After the takeover of Paestum and the area by the local Lucanian people at the end of the fifth century BC, the sanctuary reached its highest peak, with the reuse of more ancient material for the construction of new buildings: a new portico and then a meeting house. At a certain distance a square building was also built, in which many loom weights have been found – it is theorised that women about to be married would, during each year, help to weave a peplos dress for the cult statue which was offered to the goddess at an annual procession, in this building. A marble statue of Hera was also found there, seated on a throne with a pomegranate in her hand.

In 273 BC, the area was absorbed by the Roman Republic, who turned Paestum into a colonia. The weaving building was destroyed and a wall was built around the sacred area. The sanctuary survived until the second century AD, in a slow decline, until the area silted up and eventually memory of the site was lost beyond the local area. The cult of Hera survived in Christianised form as the Madonna del Granato (Madonna of the Pomegranate), whose cult in the vicinity of the sanctuary recalls the depiction of Hera with the pomegranate. The sanctuary was brought to light by the excavations of the archaeologists Umberto Zanotti Bianco and Paola Zancani Montuoro between 1934 and 1940.

Metopes

Around seventy metope reliefs carved in local sandstone have been recovered in excavations. They had been broken up, often into small fragments, and had to be pieced together like jigsaws.  Thirty eight of these belong to a more ancient group (second half of the 6th century) and must have decorated buildings which cannot now be reconstructed. It was once thought they came from a rectangular building thought to be a treasury, but excavations demonstrated that this was built much too late for the style of the reliefs. The metopes of this group depict episodes from the Twelve Labours of Heracles, the Trojan War, and the lives of Jason and Orestes.

The more recent group of around thirty metopes, from the main or second temple, depict young maidens dancing in bas-relief, reflecting the emphasis of the sanctuary cult on marriage.  These date from around 510 BC.  The earlier group were mostly carved in sections consisting of a triglyph on the left and a relief panel with figures on the right, all on a single piece of stone. In the second group each figure panel was a separate piece of stone. Some panels from both groups are very badly worn.

The local stone is coarse and not suitable for carving detail. If only for this reason the figures in the reliefs are lightly modelled and relatively flat, but round their outlines the stone has been deeply cut back.  Some have only the outline deeply carved, with the figures blank and flat.  These may have been unfinished, or intended only to be painted. The muscularity of the figures is comparable to sculptures from Sybaris. All the reliefs were almost certainly brightly painted in colours.  Though the three main Greek temples at Paestum are still standing, none of them had sculpted reliefs like these; perhaps painted scenes, now lost, substituted for them.

According to Roland Martin, these thirty-eight metopes of the older period would have decorated a Treasury (Thesauros), with a rectangular floor plan and a Doric facade with two columns in antis. The capitals of the doric columns contrasted with the Ionic capitals of the antae. The doric frieze, which had no structural function, would have been placed in front of the wooden beams which supported the roof. The triglyphs, strongly projecting, like those of Temple C at Selinus, are the same size as the metopes. The indentations visible on the rear of the metopes show that they were inserted between the triglyphs after the installation of the wooden beams.  However, excavations under the supposed treasury building now suggest that this was built much too late, and the intended home of the early group remains uncertain. It is now tending to be thought that they come from a postulated earlier temple on the site, referred to as "Hera I".

The metopes are now in the Museo archeologico nazionale di Paestum, which was built in 1950 to house these discoveries and those from Paestum itself. Their arrangement in the museum represents the presumed structure of the "treasury" building which they were thought to have decorated.  The identification of some subjects, and the extent to which the ensemble reflects a coherent programme, have continued to be discussed by scholars.

Votive gifts

The excavations of the sanctuary have also revealed a large number of votive gifts (mostly terracotta statuettes of the goddess), which were ritually buried at some point. A first deposit was found near the temple and was made up of five ditches lined by stone slabs and covered with stone as well. Some evidence of burning relates to the sacrifices offered at the time of the burial. The materials were deposited between the sixth and second centuries BC.

A second large ditch was also discovered, containing around six thousand objects, including terracotta statues and little bronze objects, dating from between the fourth and second centuries BC, but with some coins from the second century AD which were deposited in a flood during the Roman Imperial period.

A large portion of the votives are on display at the site of the sanctuary in the Museo Narrante del Santuario di Hera alla Foce del Sele, located in a reconstructed farm house (the masseria Procuriali).

Notes

Bibliography
"The Sanctuary at the mouth of the River Sele" , www.paestum.org.uk
The Frieze from the Hera I Temple at Foce del Sele by Frances Dodds Van Keuren

External links 
Museo Narrante del Santuario di Hera alla Foce del Sele

Temples in Magna Graecia
Ancient Greek archaeological sites in Italy
Buildings and structures in the Province of Salerno
Cilento
Mouth of the Sele
Paestum (ancient city)
6th-century BC religious buildings and structures
Archaeological sites in Campania